Matalobos del Páramo is a hamlet located in the municipality of Bustillo del Páramo, in León province, Castile and León, Spain. As of 2020, it has a population of 184.

Geography 
Matalobos del Páramo is located 39km southwest of León, Spain.

References

Populated places in the Province of León